The men's 100 metre backstroke was a swimming event held as part of the swimming at the 1912 Summer Olympics programme. It was the second appearance of the event, which had been introduced in 1908. In 1904 a 100-yard event was held. The competition was held from Tuesday July 9, 1912 to Saturday July 13, 1912.

Eighteen swimmers from seven nations competed.

Records

These were the standing world and Olympic records (in minutes) prior to the 1912 Summer Olympics.

The Olympic record fell during the very first heat. Harry Hebner's 1:21.0 in the first heat stood until Hebner raced again. In the first semifinal, he bettered his own new record with a 1:20.8. He was unable to match that pace in the final, but still took the win with a finish that was over 1 second faster than the second-place swimmer.

Results

Quarterfinals

The top two in each heat advanced along with the fastest loser overall.

Quarterfinal 1

Quarterfinal 2

Quarterfinal 3

Quarterfinal 4

Quarterfinal 5

Semifinals

The top two from each heat and the faster of the two third place swimmers advanced.

Semifinal 1

Semifinal 1

Final

References

Notes
 
 

Swimming at the 1912 Summer Olympics
Men's events at the 1912 Summer Olympics